The city of Birmingham, Alabama, saw a vast period of growth in the late 19th and early 20th centuries.  With its growth came an expansion in city services, notably the fire department.  A number of new stations were constructed from 1910 through 1929, many of which are still standing.  Together, ten of these historic fire stations are listed on the National Register of Historic Places as part of the Historic Fire Stations of Birmingham Multiple Property Submission.

History
Birmingham's first volunteer fire station was established in December 1871, shortly after the city was incorporated.  The city purchased its first fire engine in 1873 after a large fire affected the city.  The modern fire department was founded in 1885 with two stations.  It had grown to employ 21 firemen and 15 horses by 1890.  During the early 20th century, although Birmingham spent less money per capita on services than similarly-sized Southern cities, it spent more on fire and education.  The insistence on first-class fire protection came from downtown business leaders; better fire coverage kept their insurance rates low.  In 1910 Birmingham annexed a number of suburban towns, more than doubling the city's population.  Soon after, residents in the suburbs began to demand better fire protection, leading to many new stations being constructed; by 1929 there were 24 fire stations in Birmingham.

Architecture

Stations built before 1920 tended to be in the central business districts of the suburban towns, and their architecture reflected the commercial styles of their surroundings, with little decoration.  Similarly, stations built after 1920 were primarily in residential areas, and were built in styles popular at the time, including Spanish Revival, Tudor Revival, and Beaux-Arts.

See also
National Register of Historic Places listings in Birmingham, Alabama
National Register of Historic Places Multiple Property Submissions in Alabama

References

External links
Birmingham Fire and Rescue Service at BhamWiki

Fire stations on the National Register of Historic Places in Alabama
National Register of Historic Places in Birmingham, Alabama
National Register of Historic Places Multiple Property Submissions in Alabama